Perkins Township is one of the nine townships of Erie County, Ohio, United States.  It is part of the Sandusky, Ohio metropolitan statistical area. As of the 2010 census the population was 12,202.

Geography

Located in the western part of the county, it borders the following townships and city:
Sandusky - north
Huron Township - east
Milan Township - southeast corner
Oxford Township - south
Groton Township - southwest corner
Margaretta Township - west

No municipalities are located in Perkins Township, although the unincorporated communitiess of Bogart, Fairview Lanes, and Sandusky South lie in the township's east (Bogart) and its north along the border with the city of Sandusky (other two).

Name and history
Perkins Township was named for Elias Perkins, a native of Connecticut, who was one of its first landowners.

It is the only Perkins Township statewide.

Economy
Perkins Township houses numerous large, commercialized and tourist-related businesses, due, in large part, to Cedar Point amusement park in neighboring Sandusky. With an increase in tourism, several prominent companies have recently built large indoor/outdoor waterpark facilities, such as Great Wolf Lodge and Maui Sands, bolstering the area's vital tourism industry. In addition, the Sandusky Mall and Sandusky Speedway lie in Perkins Township.

Aside from the Mall District, the chief employer in Perkins Township is the township's Delphi Automotive plant. On March 31, 2006, Delphi announced that the plant in Perkins Township would be one of 21 it would close in the United States following the company's filing for Chapter 11 bankruptcy in October 2005. Although the Perkins Township plant remains open, its future was uncertain, as are those of the approximately 1,100 employed there. However, Delphi sold the plant in early 2008 to Kyklos, Inc, which continues to operate the plant under the name KBI.

Government
The township is governed by a three-member board of trustees, who are elected in November of odd-numbered years to a four-year term beginning on the following January 1. Two are elected in the year after the presidential election and one is elected in the year before it. There is also an elected township fiscal officer, who serves a four-year term beginning on April 1 of the year after the election, which is held in November of the year before the presidential election. Vacancies in the fiscal officership or on the board of trustees are filled by the remaining trustees.

Public services
Addresses in the township have the Sandusky ZIP code of 44870.

Perkins Township operates full-time police and fire departments, and is the only township in Erie County with its own police department.  All other townships in Erie County receive law enforcement services from the Erie County Sheriff's Office.

References

External links
Township website
County website
Perkins High School

Townships in Erie County, Ohio
Townships in Ohio